White Sands Shopping Mall (Chinese: 白沙购物中心), also known as White Sands, is a 5-storey shopping mall in Pasir Ris, Singapore. It is located near Pasir Ris MRT station and Pasir Ris Bus Interchange and features a basement with retail outlets and two additional floors of basement carparks.

The mall is a gathering spot for conscripted soldiers due to the mall's close proximity to Pasir Ris Bus Interchange, the location at which they are dropped off from the army camp on Pulau Tekong.

History
White Sands was developed by OCBC Properties Pte Ltd and was the first major mall to be opened in Pasir Ris in December 1996. Like a typical suburban mall at the time, it had an Eng Wah cinema, Singapore's first Timezone arcade (the largest arcade in Singapore as of that point), a food court, a John Little department store, a Courts store, a Popular bookstore, the local post office, an NTUC FairPrice supermarket and more than 60 specialty stores.

In 1999, due to declining patronage, the cinema and arcade were closed and were replaced by retail outlets and the Pasir Ris Public Library (which opened in October 2000) respectively. The mall was sold to ARMF Pte Ltd in 2004.

The mall did not undergo any major renovations until 2007, when more stores were opened and its facade was repainted blue. John Little was replaced by several smaller stores, and the food court was relocated to the 3rd floor, taking up the space initially occupied by Courts. The entire carpark at Basement 1 was converted to retail space and travelators were installed to link it to Basement 2 and 3 carparks.

The mall went through another round of renovations in 2014 and reopened in May 2016, with a new tenant mix, a new interior layout and an enhanced blue facade. The library was revamped, the local post office was relocated to level 5, and the bookstore relocated to level 4. Currently, its main tenants are McDonald's, NTUC FairPrice, Pasir Ris Public Library and Cookhouse by Koufu.

External links

References 

Shopping malls in Singapore
Pasir Ris